Juha Sihvola (29 August 1957, Sippola – 14 June 2012, Helsinki) was a Finnish philosopher and historian. He was a university professor of general history from  2000, and part of The Academy of Finland's Centre of Excellence program upon Philosophical Psychology, Morality and Politics, serving as the Deputy Director of the Centre of Excellence from 2008. In the years 2004–2009, he was the Director of Helsinki Collegium for Advanced Studies.

Academic career 
Sihvola defended his filosofian tohtori (Doctor of Philosophy) at the University of Helsinki on ancient Greek ethics and cultural philosophy, a work entitled, Decay, Progress, the Good Life? Hesiod and Protagoras on the Development of Culture. His supervisors were Simo Knuuttila, Holger Thesleff, Matti Viikari and Päivi Setälä. Sihvola worked as an Academy of Finland research assistant (1983–1988), junior researcher (1988–1994), and senior researcher (1995–2000). He also conducted research in Italy and the United States, where he was a visiting researcher at  Brown University(1991–1992), as well as being a junior researcher at the Center for Hellenic Studies in Washington DC (1994–1995). Sihvola taught at the University of Jyväskylä and, amongst other things, at the University of Helsinki's history, philosophy, and systematic theology departments.

Sihvola worked, amongst other things, as the editor of Historiallinen Aikakauskirja (Historical Periodical) (2001–2005), a member of the Academy of Finland's Research Council for Culture and Society (2001–2006), as well as being a member of the board of Suomen Rooman Instituutin Säätiö (Foundation of the Finnish Historical Institute in Rome) (from 2004), serving as their chairperson from 2007.

Sihvola's studies dealt with, above all, Ancient Philosophy's history and the effects upon subsequent philosophical thinking. Sihvola also applied creatively Aristotlean and Stoic philosophical ideas to current political and social debate. He discussed the investigation, among other things, of the good life, the ethics of global affairs, the ethics of foreign policy, gender, and the philosophy of religion. He wrote numerous speeches and articles in daily newspapers, in particular, the Helsingin Sanomat, and appeared on radio and television current affairs programs.

Sihvola conducted research in collaboration with Simo Knuuttila and the American philosopher Martha Nussbaum. He worked on two Knuuttila-led Academy of Finland Centres of Excellence,  History of Mind (2002–2007) and Philosophical Psychology, Morality and Politics (Deputy Director, 2008–2012). Together with Nussbaum, Sihvola organized numerous international philosophical conferences from 1991. Sihvola was also Director of the Ministry of Foreign Affairs-funded research project on ethics in foreign policy (2004–2005).

Sihvola's most famous works include Toivon vuosituhat (The Millennium of Hope) (1998), which won the Vuoden Tiedekirja (The Science Book of the Year) Award, together with a work co-authored with Martha Nussbaum, The Sleep of Reason (2002), and also Maailmankansalaisen etiikka (Ethics of the Citizen of the World)(2004), which won the Lauri Jäntin Säätiö's book award. He also served in the Aristotlean Finnish translation group on the numerous works of Aristotle. His book Maailmankansalaisen uskonto (Beliefs of the Citizen of the World) appeared in 2011, and was selected as Christian book of 2011 in the Savon Sanomat.

Sihvola received the 2011 WSOY Literary Foundation Award.

The Board of the Academy of Finland named Sihvola as Academy Professor for 2012–2016. His project dealt with tolerance and pluralism in moral psychology, philosophy, history, and political philosophy.

Private life 

Sihvola was married with Kirsi Ahonen. The family has two children, Jaakko (born 1996) and Elina (born 1998). Sihvola's hobbies included long-distance running, literature, rock music and church activities. For several years, he was both their children's soccer coach at FC Viikingit. In the parish elections of 2010, Sihvola was the politically neutral candidate of "vapaamielisen Kirkon kevät-yhdistys". He collected the most votes of all the association's candidates and was elected with 85 votes in Vuosaari Parish Council and 116 votes in the Helsinki Parish Union Church of the common council in 2011. He died of a serious illness on 14 June 2012.

Awards 

 WSOY Literary Foundation Award
 Christian book of 2011(Maailmankansalaisen uskonto)

Works 
 Decay, Progress, the Good Life? Hesiod and Protagoras on the Development of Culture (1989)
 Seppä, Tuomas & Hietaniemi, Tapani & Mikkeli, Heikki & Sihvola, Juha (Ed.): Historian alku: Historianfilosofia, aatehistoria, maailmanhistoria. Tutkijaliiton julkaisusarja 74. Helsinki: Tutkijaliitto, 1993. .
 Hyvän elämän politiikka: Näkökulmia Aristoteleen poliittiseen filosofiaan. Tutkijaliiton julkaisusarja 76. Helsinki: Tutkijaliitto, 1994. .
 Thesleff, Holger & Sihvola, Juha: Antiikin filosofia ja aatemaailma. Porvoo: WSOY, 1994. .
 Kaimio, Maarit & Aronen, Jaakko & Sihvola, Juha (Ed.): Väkivalta antiikin kulttuurissa. Helsinki: Gaudeamus, 1998. .
 Toivon vuosituhat: Eurooppalainen ihmiskuva ja suomalaisen yhteiskunnan tulevaisuus. Sitra 185. Jyväskylä: Atena, 1998. .
 The Emotions in Hellenistic Philosophy (Ed. Juha Sihvola & Troels Engberg-Pedersen 1998)
 Ancient Scepticism and the Sceptical Tradition (Ed. Juha Sihvola 2000)
 Yksilönä yhteisössä: Näkökulmia paikallisuuteen, globalisaatioon ja hyvään elämään. Kunnallisalan kehittämissäätiön Polemia-sarja nro 37. Helsinki: Kunnallisalan kehittämissäätiö, 2000. .
 
 Villa Lante: Suomen Rooman Instituutti 1954–2004 (Päivi Setälä, Liisa Suvikumpu, Juha Sihvola & Timo Keinänen 2004)
 Maailmankansalaisen etiikka. Helsingissä: Otava, 2004 (3. painos 2005). .
 Niiniluoto, Ilkka & Sihvola, Juha (Ed.): Nykyajan etiikka: Keskusteluja ihmisestä ja yhteisöstä. Helsinki: Gaudeamus, 2005. .
 Remes, Pauliina & Sihvola, Juha (Ed.): Ancient Philosophy of the Self. Springer, 2008. .
 Niiniluoto, Ilkka & Sihvola, Juha (Ed.): Tarkemmin ajatellen: Kansakunnan henkinen tila. Helsinki: Gaudeamus, 2008. .
 Maailmankansalaisen uskonto. Helsingissä: Otava, 2011. .

Sources

External links 
 
 Juha Sihvola University of Jyväskylä.
 Tyhmä sai kenkää. Punk performanssia Ramonesin hengessä - Juha Sihvolan punk-taustaa. Ramopunk.com.
 Paloranta, Pirjo: ”Myllykosken oma poika”. Kouvolan sanomat 14.6.2009.
 Villa, Janne: Aito alkuasukas ja kosmopoliitti. Sana 22.7.2010

1957 births
2012 deaths
People from Kouvola
20th-century Finnish historians
21st-century Finnish historians
20th-century Finnish philosophers
21st-century Finnish philosophers
Moral psychology